Dosinia dunkeri is a species of saltwater clam, a marine bivalve mollusc in the family Veneridae.

Description
These shells are white and rounded, with a concentric sculpture of fine ribs.

Distribution and habitat
This is a fairly common species which is present in Mexico, Panama, the United States, Costa Rica, Ecuador, Honduras and Nicaragua.

References
Angeline Myra Keen  Sea Shells of Tropical West America
Coan E.V. & Valentich-Scott P. (2012) - Bivalve seashells of tropical West America. Marine bivalve mollusks from Baja California to northern Peru. 2 vols.

External links
WoRMS
Biolib
Gwannon.com
EoL
Worldwide Mollusc Species Data Base

Dosinia
Bivalves described in 1844